Benito C. Cabanban was the first native bishop of the Philippines in The Episcopal Church.

References

Bishops of the Episcopal Church (United States)
1911 births
1990 deaths
20th-century American Episcopalians
20th-century Anglican bishops in Asia
Anglican bishops in the Philippines
Prime bishops of the Episcopal Church in the Philippines
Filipino Episcopalians
Filipino bishops
20th-century American clergy